Life's Vanquished is the name by which became known an informal group of intellectuals of great relevance to Portuguese cultural life in the last three decades of the 19th century. Among the Vanquished were some of the writers, politicians, and aristocrats that had strived to modernise the country in their youths during the Regeneration — and whose perceived failure had led them to channel their disenchantment into an elegant and ironic decadent dilettantism.

In 1889, José Maria de Eça de Queirós, arguably the most notable member of the group, explained the perverse name of the group:

See also
History of Portugal (1834–1910)
Portuguese literature

References

19th century in Portugal
Cultural history of Portugal
Literary circles